Floating Sculpture No. 3 is a public art work by artist Marta Pan located at the Lynden Sculpture Garden near Milwaukee, Wisconsin. The red fiberglass sculpture is kinetic; it is installed in the pond.

References

1972 sculptures
Outdoor sculptures in Milwaukee
Sculptures in Wisconsin
Fiberglass sculptures in Wisconsin
Kinetic sculptures in the United States
1972 establishments in Wisconsin